John Raymond Garrett (born 12 November 1940) is an Australian/British photo journalist whose work is mainly on fashion, reportage and photojournalism. He has covered situations and exhibited widely and is the author of many books.

Early life and education
Garrett was born and raised in the suburb of Kew, Victoria, near Melbourne. After completing his secondary education He attended the RMIT University where he gained a BA in photography.

Chronology
After leaving university Garrett began working for Henry Talbot, Helmut Newton photographic studio in Melbourne as a fashion photographer and worked on a number of advertising campaigns one of which included the Australian Wool Board. His street photographs of the Collins Street neighbourhood of the studio were published in Walkabout, and his pictures also featured in the Pacific Islands Monthly, and The Bulletin. After moving to England in the 1960s he worked for major fashion magazines, advertising accounts and newspapers. In later years Garrett branched into photojournalism and portrait work which involved a number of famous celebrities and politicians. He has exhibited widely and is the author of many books including The 35mm Photographer's Handbook which has sold more than 2 million copies to date. Garrett has also moved into directing, with more than 30 television commercials to his name. In 2009 Garrett moved to the United States to begin lecturing photography at university level.

1966 - 1970

Garrett moved to London in 1966 and worked as a fashion and advertising executive for fashion magazines, advertising accounts and newspapers.

1970s

In 1970 he started a reportage career by illustrating John Pilger's assignments for the Daily Mirror. Pilger was a foreign correspondent at The Times and The Mirror. Many of the stories were political. He covered the Indo-Pakistan war in 1971 for Paris Match, then continued under contract to them for most of the 1970s, with commissions in Northern Ireland and throughout Britain.
Other stories covered were:
 Poverty in Britain
 The Berlin Wall
 Apartheid demonstrations
 Enoch Powell's election campaign
All pictures were in black and white.

1980s
Garrett shot colour supplements for a number of newspapers including The Observer Magazine, Express Magazine, Telegraph Magazine and the Sunday Times Magazine. Garrett continued to work in advertising and also moved into directing with more than thirty different television commercials to his name whilst he also began to write several photographic teaching books.

1990s
In 1991 he spent six months shooting the making of a new ballet from day one of rehearsals to the opening night. Garrett reverted to black & white photography and again worked in collaborating on many stories with Pilger. He also wrote several more books and conducted teaching workshops.

2000 – to date
Garrett has worked on further photo journalistic assignments, including Israel/Palestine conflict. Garrett is currently working on a retrospective book of portraits from 1965 until now which is to include portraits from war to film stars .

Photographic books

References

External links 
Official website

1940 births
Living people
Fashion photographers
Physique photographers
Photographers from Melbourne
Australian photojournalists
British photojournalists
People from Kew, Victoria
RMIT University alumni
Australian emigrants to England
Journalists from Melbourne
20th-century Australian photographers
21st-century Australian photographers